Season five of Quantum Leap ran on NBC from September 22, 1992 to May 5, 1993. The series follows the exploits of Dr. Sam Beckett and his Project Quantum Leap (PQL), through which he involuntarily leaps through spacetime, temporarily taking over a host in order to correct historical mistakes. Season five consists of 22 episodes (when counting "Lee Harvey Oswald" as two separate episodes).

This season, the series gained a new theme song but returned to the original theme song in the season finale, "Mirror Image".  This updated theme is not used in televised syndication versions of the episodes but it is used in the Peacock broadcasts.

The episode "Lee Harvey Oswald (Part 1)" won the Primetime Emmy Award for Outstanding Single-Camera Picture Editing for a Series.

Episodes

References

Quantum Leap seasons
1992 American television seasons
1993 American television seasons